Fundacion NYC is a mix album by Welsh DJ Sasha. The album is recorded using the Ableton Live software and the album bears the name of his monthly residency nights in New York and Los Angeles.

Track listing
 Badger - "Rise of the Machine" – 2:59
 Adam Johnson - "Four Squares" – 5:25
 Swayzak - "Another Way" (Richard Davies Mix) – 6:36
 Beanfield - "Tides" featuring Bajka (C’s Movement #1) (Carl Craig Remix) – 6:36
 Kosmas Epsilon - "Innocent Thoughts" (Stel Remix) – 2:17
 Funk Da Void - "All That Matters" – 1:06
 Closer Musik - "One, Two, Three" (Ewan Pearson Remix) – 1:18
 Phonique - "99 & a Half" featuring Alexander East (I:Cube Remix) – 3:25
 Holden & Thompson - "Come to Me" (Last Version) – 3:58
 Holden & Thompson - "Come to Me" (Club Mix) – 7:06
 M.A.N.D.Y. - "Jah" – 2:17
 Playgroup - "Behind the Wheel" (DJ-Kicks Electroca$h Mix) – 4:41
 Freeform Five - "Electromagnetic" (Tiefschwarz Dub) – 4:49
 Andre Kraml - "Safari" (James Holden Remix) – 6:35
 Freaky Chakra - "Blacklight Fantasy" – 5:27
 Goldfrapp - "Strict Machine" (We Are Glitter Mix) – 5:08
 M83 - "Don't Save Us From the Flames" (Superpitcher Remix) – 6:07

Charts

References

External links

DJ mix albums
Sasha (DJ) albums
2005 compilation albums